Henry Dalziel 'Dally' O'Brien (31 October 1918 – 15 August 1996) was an Australian rules footballer who played with North Melbourne in the VFL during the 1940s.  O'Brien played 137 games for North Melbourne and was club captain in 1944 and 1945. He won their best and fairest award in 1948, also finishing equal 8th in the Brownlow Medal count.

References

External links

1918 births
1996 deaths
Australian rules footballers from Victoria (Australia)
North Melbourne Football Club players
Syd Barker Medal winners